Charles Melvin "Chick" Justice (January 26, 1909 – February 26, 1981) was an American football player and coach.  He served as the head coach of the 1942 New Hampshire Wildcats football team, compiling a record of 6–0.  Justice played college football as a guard at the University of Nebraska from 1929 to 1931.  He came to the University of New Hampshire in 1937 as line coach under fellow Nebraska alumnus George Sauer.  From 1956 to 1976, he worked for the United States Atomic Energy Commission as the chief of industrial relations.  Justice died in Albuquerque, New Mexico, on February 26, 1981.

Head coaching record

References

1909 births
1981 deaths
American football guards
Nebraska Cornhuskers football players
New Hampshire Wildcats football coaches
United States Navy personnel of World War II
People from Grand Island, Nebraska
Coaches of American football from Nebraska
Players of American football from Nebraska